Denali (also known as Mount McKinley, its former official name) is the highest mountain peak in North America, with a summit elevation of  above sea level. Located in the Alaska Range in the interior of the U.S. state of Alaska, Denali is the centerpiece of Denali National Park and Preserve.

The Koyukon people who inhabit the area around the mountain have referred to the peak as "Denali" for centuries. In 1896, a gold prospector named it "Mount McKinley" in support of then-presidential candidate William McKinley; that name was the official name recognized by the federal government of the United States from 1917 until 2015. In August 2015, 40 years after Alaska had done so, the United States Department of the Interior announced the change of the official name of the mountain to Denali.

In 1903, James Wickersham recorded the first attempt at climbing Denali, which was unsuccessful. In 1906, Frederick Cook claimed the first ascent, but this ascent is unverified and its legitimacy questioned. The first verifiable ascent to Denali's summit was achieved on June 7, 1913, by climbers Hudson Stuck, Harry Karstens, Walter Harper, and Robert Tatum, who went by the South Summit. In 1951, Bradford Washburn pioneered the West Buttress route, considered to be the safest and easiest route, and therefore the most popular currently in use.

Geology and features
Denali is a granitic pluton, mostly pink quartz monzonite, lifted by tectonic pressure from the subduction of the Pacific Plate beneath the North American Plate; at the same time, the sedimentary material above and around the mountain was stripped away by erosion. The forces that lifted Denali also caused many deep earthquakes in Alaska and the Aleutian Islands. The Pacific Plate is seismically active beneath Denali, a tectonic region that is known as the "McKinley cluster".

By comparison, Mount Everest rises from the Tibetan Plateau at a much higher base elevation.

Geography of the mountain
The North Summit is sometimes counted as a separate peak (see e.g., fourteener) and sometimes not; it is rarely climbed, except by those doing routes on the north side of the massif.

Five large glaciers flow off the slopes of the mountain. The Peters Glacier lies on the northwest side of the massif, while the Muldrow Glacier falls from its northeast slopes. Just to the east of the Muldrow, and abutting the eastern side of the massif, is the Traleika Glacier. The Ruth Glacier lies to the southeast of the mountain, and the Kahiltna Glacier leads up to the southwest side of the mountain.

Naming

The name is based on a Koyukon word for 'high' or 'tall'. It was briefly called Densmore's Mountain in the late 1880s and early 1890s after Frank Densmore, a gold prospector who was the first non-native Alaskan to reach the base of the mountain.

In 1896, a gold prospector named it McKinley as political support for then-presidential candidate William McKinley, who became president the following year. The United States formally recognized the name Mount McKinley after President Wilson signed the Mount McKinley National Park Act of February 26, 1917. In 1965, Lyndon B. Johnson declared the north and south peaks of the mountain the "Churchill Peaks", in honor of British statesman Winston Churchill. The Alaska Board of Geographic Names changed the name of the mountain to Denali in 1975, which was how it is called locally. However, a request in 1975 from the Alaska state legislature to the United States Board on Geographic Names to do the same at the federal level was blocked by Ohio congressman Ralph Regula, whose district included McKinley's home town of Canton.

On August 30, 2015, just ahead of a presidential visit to Alaska, the Barack Obama administration announced the name Denali would be restored in line with the Alaska Geographic Board's designation. U.S. Secretary of the Interior Sally Jewell issued the order changing the name to Denali on August 28, 2015, effective immediately. Jewell said the change had been "a long time coming". The renaming of the mountain received praise from Alaska's senior U.S. senator, Lisa Murkowski (R-AK), who had previously introduced legislation to accomplish the name change, but it drew criticism from several politicians from President McKinley's home state of Ohio, such as Governor John Kasich, U.S. Senator Rob Portman, U.S. House Speaker John Boehner, and Representative Bob Gibbs, who described Obama's action as "constitutional overreach" because he said an act of Congress was required to rename the mountain. The Alaska Dispatch News reported that the Secretary of the Interior has authority under federal law to change geographic names when the Board of Geographic Names does not act on a naming request within a "reasonable" period of time. Jewell told the Alaska Dispatch News that "I think any of us would think that 40 years is an unreasonable amount of time."

Indigenous names for Denali can be found in seven different Alaskan languages. The names fall into two categories. To the south of the Alaska Range in the Dena'ina and Ahtna languages the mountain is known by names that are translated as "big mountain". To the north of the Alaska Range in the Lower Tanana, Koyukon, Upper Kuskokwim, Holikachuk, and Deg Xinag languages the mountain is known by names that are translated as "the high one", "the tall one" (Koyukon, Lower and Middle Tanana, Upper Kuskokwim, Deg Xinag, and Holikachuk), or "big mountain" (Ahtna and Dena'ina). 

Asked about the importance of the mountain and its name, Will Mayo, former president of the Tanana Chiefs Conference, an organization that represents 42 Athabaskan tribes in the Alaskan interior, said "It’s not one homogeneous belief structure around the mountain, but we all agree that we’re all deeply gratified by the acknowledgment of the importance of Denali to Alaska’s people."

The following table lists the Alaskan Athabascan names for Denali.

History

The Koyukon Athabaskans, living in the Yukon, Tanana and Kuskokwim basins, were the first Native Americans with access to the flanks of the mountain. A British naval captain and explorer, George Vancouver, is the first European on record to have sighted Denali, when he noted "distant stupendous mountains" while surveying the Knik Arm of the Cook Inlet on May 6, 1794.  The Russian explorer Lavrenty Zagoskin explored the Tanana and Kuskokwim rivers in 1843 and 1844, and was likely the first European to sight the mountain from the other side.

William Dickey, a New Hampshire-born resident of Seattle, Washington who had been digging for gold in the sands of the Susitna River, wrote, after his returning from Alaska, an account in the New York Sun that appeared on January 24, 1897. Until then, Mount Logan in Canada's Yukon Territory was believed to be the continent's highest point.

On November 5, 2012, the United States Mint released a twenty-five cent piece depicting Denali National Park. It is the fifteenth of the America the Beautiful Quarters series. The reverse features a Dall sheep with the peak of Denali in the background.

Climbing history
During the summer of 1902, scientist Alfred Brooks explored the flanks of the mountain as a part of an exploratory surveying party conducted by the U.S. Geological Survey. The party landed at Cook Inlet in late May, then traveled east, paralleling the Alaska Range, before reaching the slopes of Denali in early August. Camped on the flank of the mountain on August 3, Brooks noted later that while "the ascent of Mount McKinley had never been part of our plans", the party decided to delay one day so "that we might actually set foot on the slopes of the mountain". Setting off alone, with good weather, on August 4, Brooks aimed to reach a  shoulder. At , Brooks found his way blocked by sheer ice and, after leaving a small cairn as a marker, descended. After the party's return, Brooks co-authored a "Plan For Climbing Mt McKinley", published in National Geographic magazine in January, 1903, with fellow party-member and topographer D. L. Raeburn, in which they suggested that future attempts at the summit should approach from the north, not the south. The report received substantial attention, and within a year, two climbing parties declared their intent to summit.

In the early summer of 1903, Judge James Wickersham, then of Eagle, Alaska, made the first recorded attempt to climb Denali, along with a party of four others. The group attempted to get as close to the mountain as possible via the Kantishna river by steamer, before offloading and following Chitsia Creek with a poling boat, mules and backpacks, a route suggested to them by Tanana Athabaskan people they met along the way. The party received further navigational assistance at Anotoktilon, an Athabaskan hunting camp, where residents gave the group detailed directions to reach the glaciers at the foot of Denali. On reaching the mountain, the mountaineers set up base camp on the lower portion of Peters Glacier. Aiming for the northwest buttress of Denali's north peak, they attempted to ascend directly; however, crevasses, ice fall and the lack of a clear passage caused them to turn and attempt to follow a spur via Jeffery Glacier where they believed they could see a way to the summit. Our only line of further ascent would be to climb the vertical wall of the mountain at our left, and that is impossible." This wall, now known as the Wickersham Wall, juts  upwards from the glacier to the north peak of Denali. Because of the route's history of avalanche danger, it was not successfully climbed until 1963.

Later in the summer of 1903, Dr. Frederick Cook led a team of five men on another attempt at the summit. Cook was already an experienced explorer and had been a party-member on successful arctic expeditions led both by Robert Peary and Roald Amundsen. Yet he struggled to obtain funding for the expedition under his own leadership, eventually putting it together "on a shoestring budget" without any other experienced climbers. The party navigated up the Cook inlet and followed the path of the 1902 Brooks party towards Denali. Cook approached the mountain via the Peters Glacier, as Wickersham had done; however, he was able to overcome the ice fall that had caused the previous group to turn up the spur towards the Wickersham Wall. On the descent, the group completely circumnavigated the mountain, the first climbing party to do so. Although Cook's 1903 expedition did not reach the summit, he received acclaim for the accomplishment, a  trek in which he not only circled the entire mountain but also found, on the descent, an accessible pass northeast of the Muldrow Glacier following the headwaters of the Toklat and Chulitna rivers.

In 1906, Cook launched another expedition to Denali with co-leader Herschel Parker, a Columbia University professor of electrical engineering with extensive mountaineering experience. Belmore Browne, an experienced climber and five other men comprised the rest of the group. Cook and Parker's group spent the bulk of the summer season exploring the southern and southeastern approaches to the mountain, eventually reaching a high point on Tokositna glacier,  from the summit. During their explorations the party mapped out many of the tributaries and glaciers of the Susitna river along the mountain's south flank. As the summer ended, the team retreated to the coast and began to disperse. In September 1906, Cook and a single party-member, horseman Robert Barrill, struck out towards the summit again, in what Cook later described as "a last desperate attempt" in a telegram to his financial backers. Cook and Barrill spent 12 days in total on the attempt, and claimed to have reached the summit via the Ruth Glacier.

Upon hearing Cook's claims, Parker and Browne were immediately suspicious. Browne later wrote that he knew Cook's claims were lies, just as "any New Yorker would know that no man could walk from the Brooklyn Bridge to Grant's Tomb [a distance of eight miles] in ten minutes." In May 1907, Harper's Magazine published Cook's account of the climb along with a photograph of what appeared to be Barrill standing on the summit. By 1909, Barrill had recanted at least part of his story about the climb, and others publicly questioned the account; however, Cook continued to assert his claim The controversy continued for decades. In 1956, mountaineers Bradford Washburn and Walter Gonnason tried to settle the matter, with Gonnason attempting to follow Cook's purported route to the summit. Gonnason was not able to complete the climb, but because he was turned back by poor weather, felt that this did not definitely disprove Cook's story. In 1998, historian Robert Bryce discovered an original and un-cropped version of the "fake peak" photograph of Barrill standing on the promontory. It showed a wider view of surrounding features, appearing to definitively discount Cook's claim.

Given the skepticism surrounding Cook's story, interest in claiming the first ascent remained. Miners and other Alaskans living in Kantishna and Fairbanks wanted the honors to go to local men. In 1909, four Alaska residents – Tom Lloyd, Peter Anderson, Billy Taylor, and Charles McGonagall – set out from Fairbanks, Alaska in late December with supplies and dogs that were in part paid for by bettors in a Fairbanks bar. By March 1910, the men had established a base camp near one of the sites where the Brooks party had been and pressed on from the north via the Muldrow glacier. Unlike some previous expeditions, they discovered a pass, since named McGonagall Pass, which allowed them to bypass the Wickersham Wall and access the higher reaches of the mountain. According to their account, the remaining three men pioneered a route following Karstens Ridge around the Harper Icefall, then reached the upper basin before ascending to Pioneer Ridge. The three men carried a  spruce pole. Around , Charles McGonagall, older and having exhausted himself carrying the spruce pole, remained behind. The pair erected the pole near the top, with the hope that it would be visible from lower reaches to prove they had made it.

Following the expedition, Tom Lloyd returned to Fairbanks, while the three others remained in Kantishna to mine. In Lloyd's recounting, all four men made it to the top of not only the north peak, but the higher south peak as well. When the remaining three men returned to town with conflicting accounts, the entire expedition's legitimacy was questioned. Several years later, another climbing group would claim to have seen the spruce pole in the distance, supporting their north peak claim. However, some continue to doubt they reached the summit. Outside of the single later climbing group, who were friendly with some of the Sourdough expedition men, no other group would ever see it. Jon Waterman, author of the book Chasing Denali, which explored the controversy, outlined several reasons to doubt the claim: There was never any photographic evidence. The four men climbed during the winter season, known for much more difficult conditions, along a route that has never been fully replicated. They were inexperienced climbers, ascending without any of the usual safety gear or any care for altitude sickness. Yet Waterman says "these guys were men of the trail. They didn't care what anybody thought. They were just tough SOBs." He noted that the men were largely unlettered and that some of the ensuing doubt was related to their lack of sophistication in dealing with the press and the contemporary climbing establishment.

In 1912, the Parker-Browne expedition nearly reached the summit, turning back within just a few hundred yards/meters of it due to harsh weather. On July 7, the day after their descent, a 7.4-magnitude earthquake shattered the glacier they had ascended.

The first ascent of the main summit of Denali came on June 7, 1913, by a party led by Hudson Stuck and Harry Karstens, along with Walter Harper and Robert Tatum. Karstens moved to Alaska in the gold rush of 1897, and in subsequent years became involved in a variety of endeavors beyond mining, including helping establish dog mushing routes to deliver mail across vast swathes of territory and supporting expeditions led by naturalist Charles Sheldon near the base of Denali. Stuck was an English-born Episcopal priest who came to Alaska by chance. He became acclimated to the often harsh Alaskan environment because of his many travels between far-flung outposts within his district, climbing mountains as a hobby. At 21 years old, Harper was already known as a skilled and strong outdoorsman, the Alaska-born son of a Koyukon-Athabascan mother and Irish gold prospector father. Tatum, also 21 years old, was a theology student working at a Tanana mission, and the least experienced of the team. His primary responsibility on the trip was as a cook.

The team approached the peak from the north via the Muldrow glacier and McGonagall pass. The prior year's earthquake had left what had previously been described by the Parker-Browne expedition as a gentle slope ascended in no more than three days as a dangerous, ice-strewn morass on a knife-edged ridge (later named Karstens ridge). It would take the team three weeks to cover the same ground, as Karstens and Harper laboriously cut steps into the ice. On June 7, the team made the summit attempt. Temperatures were below  at times. Every man, and particularly Stuck, suffered from altitude sickness. By midday, Harper became the first climber to reach the summit, followed seconds later by Tatum and Karstens. Stuck arrived last, falling unconscious on the summit.

Using the mountain's contemporary name, Tatum later commented, "The view from the top of Mount McKinley is like looking out the windows of Heaven!" During the climb, Stuck spotted, via binoculars, the presence of a large pole near the North Summit; this report confirmed the Sourdough ascent, and today it is widely believed that the Sourdoughs did succeed on the North Summit. However, the pole was never seen before or since, so there is still some doubt. Stuck and Karstens' team achieved the uncontroversial first ascent of Denali's south peak; however, the news was met with muted interest by the wider climbing community. Appalachia Journal, then the official journal of the American Alpine Club, published a small notice of the accomplishment a year later.

The mountain is regularly climbed today. In 2003, around 58% of climbers reached the top. But by that time, the mountain had claimed the lives of nearly 100 mountaineers. The vast majority of climbers use the West Buttress Route, pioneered in 1951 by Bradford Washburn, after an extensive aerial photographic analysis of the mountain. Climbers typically take two to four weeks to ascend Denali. It is one of the Seven Summits; summiting all of them is a challenge for mountaineers.

On August 4, 2018, five people died in the K2 Aviation de Havilland Beaver (DHC-2) crash near Denali.

Accidents

From 1947 to 2018 in the United States "2,799 people were reported to be involved in mountaineering accidents" and 11% of these accidents occurred on Denali. Of these 2,799 accidents, 43% resulted in death and 8% of these deaths occurred on Denali.

Timeline

 1896–1902: Surveys by Robert Muldrow, George Eldridge, Alfred Brooks.
 1913: First ascent, by Hudson Stuck, Harry Karstens, Walter Harper, and Robert Tatum via the Muldrow Glacier route.
 1932: Second ascent, by Alfred Lindley, Harry , Grant Pearson, Erling Strom. (Both peaks were climbed.)
 1947: Barbara Washburn becomes the first woman to reach the summit while her husband Bradford Washburn becomes the first person to summit twice.
 1951: First ascent of the West Buttress Route, led by Bradford Washburn.
 1954: First ascent of the very long South Buttress Route by George Argus, Elton Thayer (died on descent), Morton Wood, and Les Viereck. Deteriorating conditions behind the team pushed them to make the first traverse of Denali. The Great Traleika Cirque, where they camped just below the summit, was renamed Thayer Basin, in honor of the fallen climber.
 1954 (May 27) First ascent via Northwest Buttress to North Peak by Fred Beckey, Donald McLean, Charles Wilson, Henry Meybohm, and Bill Hackett 
 1959: First ascent of the West Rib, now a popular, mildly technical route to the summit.
 1961: First ascent of the Cassin Ridge, named for Riccardo Cassin and the best-known technical route on the mountain.  The first ascent team members are: Riccardo Cassin, Luigi Airoldi, Luigi Alippi, Giancarlo Canali, Romano Perego, and Annibale Zucchi.

 1962: First ascent of the southeast spur, team of six climbers (C. Hollister, H. Abrons, B. Everett, Jr., S. Silverstein, S. Cochrane, and C. Wren)
 1963: A team of six climbers (W. Blesser, P. Lev, R. Newcomb, A. Read, J. Williamson, F. Wright) made the first ascent of the East Buttress. The summit was attained via Thayer Basin and Karstens Ridge. See AAJ 1964.
 1963: Two teams make first ascents of two different routes on the Wickersham Wall.
 1967: First winter ascent, via the West Buttress, by Dave Johnston, Art Davidson and Ray Genet.
 1967: The 1967 Mount McKinley disaster; Seven members of Joe Wilcox's twelve-man expedition perish, while stranded for ten days near the summit, in what has been described as the worst storm on record. Up to that time, this was the third worst disaster in mountaineering history in terms of lives lost. Before July 1967 only four men had ever perished on Denali.
 1970: First solo ascent by Naomi Uemura.
 1970: First ascent by an all-female team (the "Denali Damsels"), led by Grace Hoeman and the later famous American high altitude mountaineer Arlene Blum together with Margaret Clark, Margaret Young, Faye Kerr and Dana Smith Isherwood.
 1972: First descent on skis down the sheer southwest face, by Sylvain Saudan, "Skier of the Impossible".
 1976: First solo ascent of the Cassin Ridge by Charlie Porter, a climb "ahead of its time".<ref
name="supertopo"></ref>
 1979: First ascent by dog team achieved by Susan Butcher, Ray Genet, Brian Okonek, Joe Redington, Sr., and Robert Stapleton.
 1984: Uemura returns to make the first winter solo ascent, but dies after summitting. Tono Križo, František Korl and Blažej Adam from the Slovak Mountaineering Association climb a very direct route to the summit, now known as the Slovak Route, on the south face of the mountain, to the right of the Cassin Ridge.
 1988: First successful winter solo ascent. Vern Tejas climbed the West Buttress alone in February and March, summitted successfully, and descended.
 1990: Anatoli Boukreev climbed the West Rib in 10 hours and 30 mins from the base to the summit, at the time a record for the fastest ascent.
 1997: First successful ascent up the West Fork of Traleika Glacier up to Karstens Ridge beneath Browne Tower. This path was named the "Butte Direct" by the two climbers Jim Wilson and Jim Blow.
 2015: On June 24, a survey team led by Blaine Horner placed two global positioning receivers on the summit to determine the precise position and elevation of the summit. The United States National Geodetic Survey later determined the summit elevation to be .

Weather station

In 1998, this weather station was donated to the International Arctic Research Center at the University of Alaska Fairbanks. In June 2002, a weather station was placed at the  level. This weather station was designed to transmit data in real-time for use by the climbing public and the science community. Since its establishment, annual upgrades to the equipment have been performed with instrumentation custom built for the extreme weather and altitude conditions. This weather station is the third-highest weather station in the world.

Historical record
Harry J. Liek took the thermometer back to Washington, D.C. where it was tested by the United States Weather Bureau and found to be accurate. Another thermometer was placed at the  level by the U.S. Army Natick Laboratory, and was there from 1950 to 1969. The coldest temperature recorded during that period was also .

Subpeaks and nearby mountains

Besides the North Summit mentioned above, other features on the massif which are sometimes included as separate peaks are:
 South Buttress, ; mean prominence: 
 East Buttress high point, ; mean prominence: 
 East Buttress, most topographically prominent point, ; mean prominence: 
 Browne Tower, ; mean prominence: 

Nearby peaks include:
 Mount Crosson
 Mount Foraker
 Mount Silverthrone
 Mount Hunter
 Mount Huntington
 Mount Dickey
 The Moose's Tooth

Taxonomic honors

 denaliensis
 Ceratozetella denaliensis (formerly Cyrtozetes denaliensis Behan-Pelletier, 1985) is a species of moss mite in the family Mycobatidae :sv:Ceratozetella denaliensis
 Magnoavipes denaliensis Fiorillo et al., 2011 (literally "bird with large feet found in Denali") is a Magnoavipes ichnospecies of bird footprint from the Upper Cretaceous of Alaska and was a large heron-like bird (as larger than a sandhill crane) with three toes and toe pads. :pt:Magnoavipes denaliensis
 denali
  (Fjellberg, 1985) is a springtail.
 Proclossiana aphirape denali Klots, 1940 is a Boloria butterfly species of the subfamily Heliconiinae of family Nymphalidae.
  (Alexander, 1955) is a species of crane fly in the family Limoniidae.
  Alexander, 1969 is a species of crane fly in the family Tipulidae.
 denalii
 Erigeron denalii A. Nelson, 1945 or Denali fleabane is an Erigeron fleabane species.
 Papaver denalii Gjaerevoll 1963 is an Papaver species and synonym of  Papaver mcconnellii.
 mckinleyensis or mackinleyensis
 Erebia mackinleyensis (Gunder, 1932) or Mt. McKinley alpine is a butterfly species of the subfamily Satyrinae of family Nymphalidae. 
 Oeneis mackinleyensis Dos Passos 1965 or Oeneis mckinleyensis Dos Passos 1949 is a butterfly species of the subfamily Satyrinae of family Nymphalidae (synonym of Oeneis bore)
 Uredo mckinleyensis Cummins 1952 or Uredo mackinleyensis Cummins 1952 is a rust fungus species.

In popular culture 

 In 2019, American educational animated series Molly of Denali, named for the region, premiered on PBS and CBC Kids. The show depicts the daily life and culture of Molly, a young Alaskan Native girl and vlogger. The animated series has received acclaim for its representation of indigenous Alaskan culture.

See also

 List of mountain peaks of North America
 List of mountain peaks of the United States
 List of mountain peaks of Alaska
 List of U.S. states by elevation
 List of the highest major summits of the United States
 List of the most prominent summits of the United States
 List of the most isolated major summits of the United States
 Extremes on Earth

References

Bibliography

External links

 Mt. McKinley Weather Station
 Denali at SummitPost
 Timeline of Denali climbing history, National Park Service 
 
 Mount Mckinley Quadrangle Publications, Alaska Division of Geological & Geophysical Surveys

 
North American 6000 m summit
Alaska Range
Mountains of Alaska
Seven Summits
Highest points of United States national parks
Sacred mountains
Mountains of Denali Borough, Alaska
Denali National Park and Preserve
Religious places of the indigenous peoples of North America
Highest points of U.S. states
Highest points of countries
Naming controversies
Ahtna